EUTM Mali (European Union Training Mission in Mali) is a European Union multinational military training mission headquartered in Bamako, Mali.

22 EU members (Austria, Belgium, Bulgaria, Czech Republic, Estonia, Finland, France, Germany, Greece, Hungary, Ireland, Italy, Latvia, Lithuania, Luxembourg, Netherlands, Portugal, Romania, Slovakia, Slovenia, Spain, Sweden) and 4 non-EU countries (Serbia, Georgia, Moldova, and Montenegro) are engaged in this mission and have sent soldiers to the Republic of Mali.

Mandates 
Since 2013, Council has adopted several decisions. According to these documents, EUTM Mali has evolved towards its current nature. The most relevant ones has been:
 Council Decision 2013/34/CFSP: EUTM Mali creation
 Council Decision 2013/87/CFSP: EUTM Mali mission launching
 Council Decision 2014/220/CFSP: 2nd mandate. EUTM Mali is extended until 18 May 2016.
 Council Decision 2016/446/CFSP: 3rd mandate. EUTM Mali extension until 18 May 2018.
 Council Decision (CFSP) 2018/716: EUTM Mali 4th mandate. EUTM Mali extension until 18 May 2020.

Relationships 
EUTM Mali has links with EUCAP Sahel Mali, the United Nations Multidimensional Integrated Stabilization Mission in Mali and Operation Barkhane in the north of Mali, with which EUTM shares the same goal, to help Mali to free the north of its territory. Notwithstanding, EUTM Mali's mission is a mission of training and advice. After France, Germany, Belgium (in 2016), Czech Republic became in 2020 the leading nation of this mission.

EU Mission Force Commander of EUTM Mali

References

External links 
 EUTM Mali Official website

2013 in Mali
Mali
Military of Mali
2013 in the European Union
Military operations involving the Czech Republic
Military operations involving Poland
Mali War
Military operations involving Portugal